The 1996 Romanian Open was a men's tennis tournament played on outdoor clay courts at the Arenele BNR in Bucharest, Romania that was part of the World Series of the 1996 ATP Tour. It was the fourth edition of the tournament and was held from 9 September until 15 September 1996. Fourth-seeded Alberto Berasategui won the singles title.

Finals

Singles 

 Alberto Berasategui defeated  Carlos Moyá 6–1, 7–6(7–5)
 It was Berasategui's third title of the year and the 12th of his career.

Doubles 

 David Ekerot /  Jeff Tarango defeated  David Adams /  Menno Oosting 7–6, 7–6
 It was Ekerot's second title of the year and of his career. It was Tarango's second title of the year and fifth of his career.

References

External links 
  
 ITF tournament edition details
 ATP tournament profile

Romanian Open
1996
Romanian Open
Romanian Open